Vernon Delma Furniss (July 30, 1934 – January 31, 2022) was an American Democratic politician and railroad conductor. He was a member of the Mississippi State Senate from 1993 to 2004, and a member of the Mississippi House of Representatives from 1984 to 1993.

Biography 
Vernon Delma Furniss was born on July 30, 1934, in Belen, Mississippi. He received a B. A. degree from Delta State University and a M. S. degree from the University of Mississippi. Furniss was a conductor for the Illinois Central Railroad. He was a member of the Mississippi House of Representatives from 1984 to 1993. He then was a member of the Mississippi State Senate from 1993 until his retirement in 2004. Furniss was a Democrat. Furniss died on January 31, 2022.

References 

1934 births
2022 deaths
Democratic Party members of the Mississippi House of Representatives
Democratic Party Mississippi state senators
Delta State University alumni
University of Mississippi alumni
20th-century American politicians
21st-century American politicians
People from Quitman County, Mississippi
Conductor (rail)